The Title of Attorney (Título de Abogado), prefix: Abog. is an undergraduate degree given to law students in Argentina.  After 5 to 6 years of studying law, it grants the applicant with a professional degree that allows them to practice their profession as a lawyer anywhere in the jurisdiction of Argentina.

See also
 Attorney at law
 Doctor of Law (Argentina)
 Doctor of Juridical Science (Argentina)

Professional certification in law
Education in Argentina